Navatrasierra is a village that is part of the Villar del Pedroso municipality in the province of Cáceres, Extremadura, Spain. According to the 2014 census, the village has a population of 198 inhabitants.

Geography
Navatrasierra is located in a mountainous area between the Sierra de Altamira in the northeast and the Sierra del Hospital del Obispo; the latter's highest peak is 1443 m high. These ranges are part of the Montes de Toledo system.

The Navatrasierra Shale Formation from the Ordovician period, is named after this town.

Local celebrations
Santo Tomás Apóstol, on 21 December

See also
List of fossiliferous stratigraphic units in Spain

References

External links

Ayuntamiento de Navatrasierra - Government Organization

Populated places in the Province of Cáceres